2140 Kemerovo, provisional designation , is a dark asteroid from the outer region of the asteroid belt, approximately 30 kilometers in diameter.

The asteroid was discovered on 3 August 1970, by Russian female astronomers Lyudmila Chernykh and Tamara Smirnova at the Crimean Astrophysical Observatory in Nauchnyj, on the Crimean peninsula. It was named after Kemerovo Oblast in Siberia.

Orbit and classification 

Kemerovo orbits the Sun in the outer main-belt at a distance of 2.8–3.2 AU once every 5 years and 2 months (1,886 days). Its orbit has an eccentricity of 0.06 and an inclination of 7° with respect to the ecliptic.

The body's observation arc begins with its first used observation, a precovery taken at Palomar Observatory in 1951, approximately 19 years prior to its official discovery at Nauchnyj.

Physical characteristics 

In the Tholen taxonomy, Kemerovo is an X-type asteroid. The dark body has also been characterized as a rare and reddish P-type asteroid by the NEOWISE mission.

Lightcurves 

Two rotational lightcurves of Kemerovo were obtained from photometric observations made by French astronomers René Roy, Laurent Bernasconi and Olivier Thizy in August 2001 and July 2006. Both lightcurves gave a rotation period of  hours with a brightness amplitude of 0.18 and 0.19 in magnitude, respectively.

Diameter and albedo 

According to the space-based surveys carried out by the Infrared Astronomical Satellite IRAS, the Japanese Akari satellite (mid-infrared), and the NEOWISE mission of NASA's Wide-field Infrared Survey Explorer, Kemerovo measures between 29.5 and 37.9 kilometers in diameter, and its surface has an albedo between 0.05 and 0.09. The Collaborative Asteroid Lightcurve Link derives an albedo of 0.062 and calculates a diameter of 29.3 kilometers with an absolute magnitude of 11.3.

Naming 

This minor planet was named after Kemerovo Oblast, the regional center of the Russian Kemerovo district, and a significant industrial center in Siberia. The official naming citation was published by the Minor Planet Center on 8 February 1982.

References

External links 
 Asteroid Lightcurve Database (LCDB), query form (info )
 Dictionary of Minor Planet Names, Google books
 Asteroids and comets rotation curves, CdR – Observatoire de Genève, Raoul Behrend
 Discovery Circumstances: Numbered Minor Planets (1)-(5000) – Minor Planet Center
 
 

002140
Discoveries by Lyudmila Chernykh
Discoveries by Tamara Mikhaylovna Smirnova
Named minor planets
Kemerovo Oblast
002140
19700803